St George's Church is an Anglican church in Barcelona, Spain. It is part of the Diocese in Europe of the Church of England.

The church conducts English-language services of Christian worship in Barcelona. It is  located in the Sant Gervasi – la Bonanova district, and the nearest Barcelona Metro station is Avinguda Tibidabo.

History

During the mid-19th century, Church of England worship was held in the official residence of the British Consul in Barcelona.

With the support of the Colonial & Continental Church Society (C&CCS), the Consul-General and the British community in Barcelona raised funds to erect a church at Rosellon 250 (Carrer de Rosseló), close to the junction of Passeig de Gracia and Avinguda Diagonal. The new church was built in 1904-05 and was consecrated in May 1905.

Between 1936 and 1945, St George's was temporarily closed during the Spanish Civil War and World War II.

In 1971–72, a new building was constructed, and in July 1972 St George's Church moved to the present building on Carrer d’Horaci in the north-west of the city. It was consecrated on 6 May 1973.

See also 
 Anglicanism in Spain

References

External links

George
George Barcelona
Barcelona George
Sarrià-Sant Gervasi
Religious buildings and structures in Barcelona
Churches completed in 1972
Rebuilt churches
1905 establishments in Spain